George Slythe Street (18 July 1867 – 31 October 1936) was a British critic, journalist and novelist. He was born in Wimbledon, London on 18 July 1867. He was associated with William Ernest Henley and the 'counter-Decadents' on the staff of the National Observer. His works were characterized by "whimsy, detachment, sympathy, tenderness, satire, humor, and occasionally cynicism". Street's satirical works assailed "snobbery, hypocrisy, vulgarity, and pretentiousness at all levels of society, especially among the aesthetes and the upper class". He is perhaps best known for his 1894 novel, the Autobiography of a Boy, which satirized contemporary aesthetes Oscar Wilde and Lord Alfred Douglas, although Street would later write favorably of Wilde's De Profundis.

In 1914 Street was appointed to the office of the Lord Chamberlain as joint Examiner of Plays with E.A. Bendall. He became sole examiner in 1920.

He died on 31 October 1936.

Bibliography
The Autobiography of a Boy (1894) 
Episodes (1895) 
Miniatures and Moods (1893) 
Quales Ego: a Few Remarks in Particular and at Large (1896)
The Wise and the Wayward (1896) 
Some Notes of a Struggling Genius (1898)
The Trial of the Bantocks (1900) 
A Book of Stories (1902) 
A Book of Essays (1902) 
The Views of an Angry Man (1902) 
Books and Things: a Collection of Stray Remarks (1905) 
The Ghosts of Piccadilly (1907) 
People and Questions (1910) 
On Money and Other Essays (1914)
The London Assurance, 1720-1920 (1920)

See also
Orthodoxy (book)

Notes

External links
 
 
 

British critics
British male journalists
19th-century British novelists
20th-century British novelists
1867 births
1936 deaths
British male novelists
19th-century British male writers
20th-century British male writers